The term Total Experience (abbreviation TX) describes all aspects of the impressions and the experience of all users, in the context of an organization. In particular, this includes the previously separate disciplines of customer experience (CX), employee experience (EX), user experience (UX) and multi-experience (MX).

TX has been identified as an important trend for 2021 by analysts Gartner and KPMG, among others.

See also 
 Digital transformation

References 

Human–computer interaction
User interfaces
Usability